Eupithecia tropicata is a moth in the family Geometridae that is endemic to Thailand.

The forewings are fuscous blackish grey and the hindwings are dirty white or whitish grey with an ochreous tinge.

References

Moths described in 2009
Endemic fauna of Thailand
Moths of Asia
tropicata